Clinical Pharmacology: Advances and Applications is a peer-reviewed medical journal covering research in pharmacology, clinical trials, drugs and drug safety. The journal was established in 2010 and is published by Dove Medical Press.

External links 
 

English-language journals
Open access journals
Dove Medical Press academic journals
Pharmacology journals
Publications established in 2010